"Blink" is a song by English dance-pop duo U.V.U.K. It was released as the group's second single on March 27, 2012 through Robbins Entertainment. The song was written by Eric Sanicola, Damon Sharpe, and Shanna Crooks, and it was produced by Sanicola and Sharpe. The lyrics of the song are about enjoying and making the best of life and not wanting to miss any of it.

Track listing
Digital download
"Blink" – 3:50
"Blink" (extended) – 5:11

Cascada version

In 2014, "Blink" was covered by German dance act Cascada. The single was released on March 28, 2014.

Background
On 12 December 2013, German DJ and producer, CJ Stone revealed that he was working on a remix for the latest Cascada release. He shared with eager fans that the single is titled "Blink" and would be released in early 2014. The track was originally recorded and released by pop group U.V.U.K. in 2012. However the single was not commercially a success, so it was given to Cascada to release.

Music video
On 10 January 2014, Natalie posted on Facebook that they were busy planning the music video for the new single. Then again on 15 January 2014, she posted that they were getting ready for the video shoot. Natalie has posted a first impressions teaser of the video, and the video premiered on 27 March 2014.

The video starts off with Natalie singing to the screen in numerous positions using many hand gestures. The scene eventually goes with Natalie inside a box like small area where she swings around slowing whilst singing the song. During the chorus, Horler is pulling off her famous moves and hand gestures whilst over dancers break-dance behind a futuristic wall reminiscent to the Pyromania video. Throughout the song, Horler is seen to be lying on the ground, in the box area, in the futuristic area dancing with other dancers whilst singing.

Track listing

Charts

Release history

References

2012 singles
Dance-pop songs
2012 songs
Songs written by Eric Sanicola
Songs written by Damon Sharpe